Ali Danaeifard (2 October 1921 – 5 November 1979) was an Iranian football player. He was first head coach of Esteghlal Tehran. Many people call him Father of Esteghlal. His son Iraj Danaeifard also became a professional football player.

References

Iranian footballers
Iran international footballers
Esteghlal F.C. players
1921 births
1979 deaths
Sportspeople from Tehran
Association football midfielders
Esteghlal F.C. managers
Iranian football managers
20th-century Iranian people